Quarto d'Altino is a town in the Metropolitan City of Venice, Veneto, Italy. SP41 provincial road goes through it.

The name "Quarto D'Altino" is composed by the prefix "Quarto" because the town was a quarter of a mile from the Roman city Altinum.

Transportation
The town is served by the Quarto d'Altino railway station.

Sources

External links
(Google Maps)

Cities and towns in Veneto